Prelude and Sonata is an album by McCoy Tyner released on Key'stone and Milestone label in 1995. It was recorded in November 1994 and features performances of classical and contemporary music by Tyner with alto saxophonist Antonio Hart, tenor saxophonist Joshua Redman, bassist Christian McBride and drummer Marvin "Smitty" Smith. The AllMusic review by Ken Dryden states that "This release is definitely off the beaten path for McCoy Tyner, but it is well worth acquiring".

Track listing
 "Prelude in E Minor Op. 28, No. 4" (Frédéric Chopin) - 6:15  
 "Loss of Love" (Henry Mancini, Bob Merrill) - 8:35  
 "Contemplation" - 11:06  
 "For All We Know" (J. Fred Coots, Sam M. Lewis) - 6:57  
 "I Will Wait for You" (Jacques Demy, Norman Gimbel, Michel Legrand) - 7:04  
 "Soul Eyes" (Mal Waldron) - 6:26  
 "Smile" (Charlie Chaplin) - 6:33  
 "Good Morning Heartache" (Ervin Drake, Dan Fisher, Irene Higginbotham) - 4:16  
 "Piano Sonata No. 8 in C Minor" (Ludwig van Beethoven) - 6:30  
All compositions by McCoy Tyner except as indicated
Recorded November 26 & 27, 1994 at Clinton Recording Studio, New York City

Personnel
McCoy Tyner - piano
Antonio Hart - alto saxophone 
Joshua Redman - tenor saxophone (tracks 1, 3 & 4)
Christian McBride - bass
Marvin "Smitty" Smith - drums

References

McCoy Tyner albums
1995 albums
Milestone Records albums